Cirebon Regency is a regency (kabupaten) of West Java, Indonesia. Sumber is its capital. It covers 1,070.29 km2 and had a population of 2,068,116 at the 2010 census and 2,270,621 at the 2020 census; the official estimate as at mid 2021 was 2,290,967. These area and population figures exclude those of Cirebon City, which is an independent administration, although totally surrounded by the regency on its landward side.

The Cirebon region is renowned for the production of various types of mangoes.  There are plans to support the expansion of mango production in the region both for export as well as for the domestic market.  Mango production is currently concentrated in just a few parts of the regency. Local farmers and officials believe there is considerable potential to expand production to other nearby parts of the locality.

Etymology
Being on the border of Sundanese (i.e., West Java) and Javanese (i.e., Central Java) cultural regions, many of Cirebon's residents speak a dialect that is a mix of Sundanese and Javanese, known as the Jawareh dialect, and it is thought that the word "Cirebon" derives from the Javanese word, caruban, meaning "mixed", a reference to the city's mix of Sundanese, Javanese, Chinese, and Arabic cultural elements. Alternatively, it could be derived from the Sundanese words of "Ci" (water or river) and "Rebon" ("shrimp"). (Indeed, the main production of the city is fishery including shrimps).

History

According to the manuscript Purwaka Caruban Nagari, in 15th century Cirebon started as a small fishing village named Muara Jati. At that time the port of Muara Jati already attracted foreign traders. The port master at that time is Ki Gedeng Alang-Alang whose appointed by the king of Galuh kingdom located inland in Kawali, Ciamis. He moved the port to Lemahwungkuk, 5 kilometres southward. As the new settlement leader, Ki Gedeng Alang-Alang was bestowed the title "Kuwu Cerbon" (Cerbon village leader).

A 15th century prince from Pajajaran, Prince Walangsungsang, converted to Islam, and was appointed as the Adipati (Duke) of Cirebon with the title Cakrabumi. He established the new kingdom of Cirebon and declared independence from Sunda and Galuh. The establishment of Cirebon Sultanate marked the first Islamic rule in Western Java, that grew from modest fishing village of Muara Jati to a busy port of Java northern coast. Cirebon grew as one of the independent sultanates under the leadership of Sunan Gunungjati, in the early 16th century.

After the Sunda Kingdom collapsed, The Sultanates of Banten and Mataram fought control over Cirebon, which declared its allegiance to Sultan Agung of Mataram. But the latter's grandson Amangkurat II ceded the city to the Dutch in 1677. A treaty in 1705 saw the Cirebon area west of Cisanggarung River became a Dutch protectorate jointly administered by three sultans whose courts rivalled those of Central Java. The Dutch authorities later established the Cirebon Residence (Residentie Tjirebon) which composed of present-day Cirebon, Indramayu, and Kuningan.

During the time of the Dutch "Culture System" a flourishing trade in colonial cash crops attracted many Chinese entrepreneurs and the Chinese influence is still evident in the batik for which Cirebon is famous. Cirebon suffered a famine in 1844, apparently triggered by a combination of drought and the shift from subsistence agriculture to cash crops, particularly indigo and sugarcane.

Campaign for Cirebon Province
Some of the local political elite in Cirebon and surrounding regencies have campaigned for Cirebon city, together with the regencies of Cirebon, Indramayu, Kuningan and Majalengka to be established as a new province - in the same way as Banten Province was formed by splitting it away from West Java. To be a new province it is required that it should be proposed by at least three regencies. Leaders from four of these administrations have given their consent, but Majalengka Regency has turned down the idea and indicated that it would prefer to stay part of West Java.  However, the lack of support from the Majalengka area does not preclude Cirebon city and the other three regencies from continuing to promote the idea.

The potential size and population of this possible Province would be as follows:

Geography
Cirebon Regency is bordered by the Java Sea to the north-east, by Indramayu Regency to the north, Majalengka Regency to the west, Kuningan Regency to the south, and Brebes Regency (in Central Java Province) to the southeast. A small landing site "Penggung" also serves the TNI-AU. The city lies on Jalur Pantura (Pantai Utara Jawa), a major road on the northern coast of Java that stretches from Anyer, passes through Jakarta, and ends at Surabaya.

Administrative divisions

Cirebon Regency (excluding Cirebon City) is divided into forty districts (kecamatan), listed below with their areas and their populations at the 2010 census and the 2020 census, together with the official estimates as at mid 2021.

The city of Cirebon virtually splits the Regency geographically into two parts. The eighteen districts in the first half of the table lie to the south and east of the city, while the twenty-two districts in the second half of the table are situated to the north and west of the city.

Demographics 
The city's population was 298,224 at the census of 2010 and 333,303 at the census of 2020. The official estimate as at mid 2021 was 336,860. As with other coastal cities in Indonesia, a large population of ethnic Chinese has flocked into the city as a result of long-term Chinese immigration since the 17th century.  Significant suburbs lie within densely populated Cirebon Regency, and the official metropolitan area encompasses this entire regency as well as the city.  As many in Indonesia still go by one name as in tradition, the country is facing a major overhaul of its identification cards (:id:Kartu Tanda Penduduk elektronik), new data is challenging 2010 population census figures, however the accuracy vis-a-vis the census remains unknown.

{| class="wikitable" style="text-align:right;"
|-
! Administrative division
! Area (km2)
! Population 2010 census
! SIAK Database (2011)
! Population  2020 census
! Population  mid 2021estimate
! Population densitymid 2021 (/km2)
|-
| style="text-align:left;"| Cirebon (Kota)
| align="right"| 37.36
| align="right"| 298,224
| align="right"| 329,669
| align="right"| 333,303
| align="right"| 336,860
| align="right"| 9,017
|-
| style="text-align:left;"| Cirebon Regency
| align="right"| 1,070.29
| align="right"| 2,068,116
| align="right"| 2,388,562
| align="right"| 2,270,621
| align="right"| 2,290,967
| align="right"| 2,141
|-
| style="text-align:left;"| Metropolitan area
| align="right"| 1,107.65
| align="right"| 2,366,340
| align="right"| 2,696,009
| align="right"| 2,603,924
| align="right"| 2,627,827
| align="right"| 2,372|}

sources: (Budan Pusat Statistik 2010 and 2020 censuses of Indonesia)
 https://web.archive.org/web/20120628013636/http://www.bps.go.id/aboutus.php?sp=0&kota=32 Tabel Hasil Sensus Penduduk 2010 Provinsi JAWA BARAT
 https://web.archive.org/web/20131014170450/http://www.jabarprov.go.id/index.php/subMenu/75 Sumber : Database SIAK Provinsi Jawa Barat Tahun 2011
 
Although surrounded by Sundanese-speaking areas in West Java, linguists have stated that Cirebon (and the historically related region of Serang city in Banten Province) are inside its own Cirebonese language area. In addition, this is supported by a large portion of the Cirebon people referring to themselves as "Wong Cirebon" ("Cirebonese people"), and to their language as "Basa Cirebon" ("Cirebonese"). Cirebonese language is related to Javanese and Banyumasan with dialects such as the Jawareh, Plered, and Dermayon dialects. A portion of people in eastern Cirebon identified themselves as either Javanese or Banyumasan, while people lived in the border region with the Kuningan and Majalengka Regencies identified themselves as Sundanese.

 Economy 
Cirebon City economy is influenced by the strategic geographical location and characteristics of natural resources so that the structure of its economy dominated by manufacturing, trade, hotels and restaurants, transport and communications and service sectors. Tomé Pires in the Suma Oriental around the year 1513 mentions Cirebon is one of the trade center on the island of Java. After Cirebon taken over by the Dutch East Indies government, in 1859, designated as a transit port of Cirebon import-export goods and the political control center for the region in the interior of Java.

Until 2001, the economic contribution to the City of Cirebon is a processing industry (41.32%), followed by trade, hotels and restaurants (29.8%), transport and communications sector (13.56%), services sector (6.06%). While other sectors (9.26%) including mining, agriculture, construction, electricity, gas and an average of 2-3%.

Aside from fishery, its harbour, Tanjung Emas, on the Java Sea has been a major hub for timber from Borneo.

 Culture 

Cirebon itself is known as Grage in its native Cirebonese language, which came from the words "Negara Ge'de", meaning "Great Kingdom." As a port city, Cirebon attract settlers from around and overseas alike. Cirebon culture was described as Java Pasisiran (coastal) culture, similar with those of Banten, Batavia, Pekalongan, and Semarang, with notable influences mixture of Chinese, Arabic-Islamic, and European influences.

 Arts and crafts 
Batik textiles from Cirebon are particularly renowned. The notable one is Cirebon batik with vivid colors with motifs and patterns that clearly demonstrate Chinese and local influences. Chinese influences can be seen in Cirebon's culture, most notably the Cirebon batik Megamendung pattern that resembles Chinese cloud imagery. The Trusmi area is well known as the production center of Cirebon batik. The glass painting art also has been known as Cirebon arts and craft. The imagery usually derived from wayang theme to Islamic calligraphy.

 Performing arts 
The Tari Topeng Cirebon, or Cirebon mask dance, is a dance style peculiar to the city. Topeng Cirebon mask dance, inspired by Javanese Panji cycles is one of notable Cirebon traditional dance and quite famous within Indonesian dances.

Cirebon culture also influenced by Islamic Middle Eastern culture, such as the Burokan tradition where people held the image of buraq — traditionally made from bamboo frame and paper skin, or other materials — around the village accompanied with music. The traditions on held bamboo statues is similar with Sundanese Sisingaan, Betawi Ondel-ondel, or Balinese Ogoh-ogoh, yet differ in its Islamic theme. Burokan usually held during festive occasion such as circumcision or marriage, accompanied by popular Cirebon folk songs, such as tarling.Tarling is a musical tradition reminiscent  of Bandung's kecapi suling music with except that it features guitar, suling (bamboo flute) and voice. The name derived from gitar (guitar), and suling (flute).

 Court culture 
The remnants of Cirebon sultanate; Kasepuhan, Kanoman, Kaprabonan, and Kacirebonan  are now run as cultural institution to preserve Cirebon culture. Each still held their traditional ceremonies and become the patrons of Cirebon arts. Some of royal symbols of Cirebon Sultanate describe their legacy and influences. The banner of Cirebon Sultanate is called "Macan Ali" (Ali's panther) with Arabic calligraphy arranged to resemble a panther or tiger, describe both Islamic influence and also Hindu Pajajaran Sundanese King Siliwangi tiger banner. Although did not held real political power anymore, the royal lineage of Cirebon still well respected and held in high prestige among the people of Cirebon.

The royal carriage of Kasepuhan's Singa Barong and Kanoman's Paksi Naga Liman carriage resemble the chimera of three animals; eagle, elephant, and dragon, to symbolize Indian Hinduism, Arabic Islam, and Chinese influences. The images of Macan Ali, Singa Barong and Paksi Naga Liman also often featured as pattern in Cirebon batik.

 Cuisine 

As a coastal city, Cirebon's main industry is fishery. Its products include terasi (shrimp paste), petis, krupuk udang (shrimp crackers) and various salted fish. Cirebon is famous for its good quality salted fishes, such as jambal roti, juhi (salted cuttlefish), rebon and ebi (dried small shrimp). These products often being seek by visitors, especially Indonesian domestic tourist and visitors from other cities, as oleh-oleh (food souvenirs/gift).

Cirebon is also known for its local cuisines and delicacies, such as empal gentong (a kind of meat and offal curry ), nasi lengko (rice mixed with bean sprouts, fried tofu, fried tempeh, topped with peanut sauce and soy sauce), nasi jamblang (rice of various side dishes), tahu gejrot (fried tofu with ground garlic, chili and shallot, topped with thin and sweet soy sauce), tahu petis (dry fried tofu served with petis dip sauce), tahu tek-tek (fried tofu topped with peanut sauce and mixed with vegetables) and ayam panggang (barbecue chicken). Another native food is "Docang" (lontong with sour vegetable soup).

The snack kue gapit originates from the region.

 Tourism 
The main boulevard is Jalan Siliwangi and it runs from the train station to the canal via the Pasar Pagi'' ("Morning Market"), and then the street becomes Jalan Karanggetas along which are most of Cirebon's banks, restaurants, and hotels.  There are a number of historic buildings and other key sites in Cirebon, some of them in an advanced state of decay, including the buildings of the several kratons, the Sang Cipta Rasa Grand Mosque, and the Gua Sunyaragi Park.

Wali Songo, especially Sunan Gunung Jati, is known to have influenced the city's history. Sunan Gunung Jati's grave is located several kilometres outside the city in the Gunung Jati district.  There are two temples and a cave system built by two Chinese architects around the 1880s, decorated by Chinese and Western porcelain. The village of Trusmi, about five kilometers outside of Cirebon, has been noted for batik production. Plangon is a habitat of monkeys.

Mt Ceremai, the highest peak in West Java, is a large volcano situated about 40 km to the south of Cirebon. Parks and other tourist spots on the slopes of Mt Ceremai are popular places for groups from Cirebon to visit during weekends to escape from the hotter climate on the coast. The village of Linggajati, near the town of Cilimus, where the Linggadjati Agreement was signed is one such place which bus loads of tourists call in at.

Public service 
Nearly 93% of the population has been underserved by service water from PDAM Cirebon, the majority of customers in the city's water supply to households (90.37% or as many as 59,006) of the total number of existing connections (65,287).

Health 
Since the Dutch East Indies government, Cirebon City has had a hospital named Orange, which unveiled its use on August 31, 1921, and commenced operations from September 1, 1921.

In 2009 in the city of Cirebon has been available about 6 general hospitals, four maternity hospitals, 21 health centers, 15 health centers Maid, 20 Mobile Health Center, and 81 Pharmacies and Drug Stores 31. With the number of medical personnel such as specialist doctors about 94 people, and 116 general practitioners, 37 dentists, 847 nurses and 278 midwives.

References

External links
 Official site